Tiden Norsk Forlag is a Norwegian publishing company owned by Gyldendal Norsk Forlag. It publishes fiction and general literature.

History
Tiden was founded in 1933 by the Norwegian Labour Party. In 1936 it bought Fram Forlag. In the early years the largest authors were Aksel Sandemose and Lars Berg, with large names such as Alf Prøysen and Anne Cath. Vestly after the war. During the German occupation of Norway 1940-45 Tiden was the only publishing company closed by the German forces, with CEO Kolbjørn Fjeld being arrested in the fall of 1940. Large numbers of books were confiscated and destroyed.

In 1947 the company was reorganized with the Labour Party, the Norwegian Confederation of Trade Unions (LO) and Norwegian Union of Chemical Industry Workers the largest owners. In 1991 it was taken over by Gyldendal with 91% ownership, while LO retained a 9% ownerships. In 2004 the last stocks were sold to Gyldendal, and reorganized as a department of Gyldendal, though the brand remains. The children- and youth division of Tiden was merged with Gyldendal's to create Gyldendal Tiden ANS in 1996, though this has been renamed to Gyldendal Barn & Ungdom in 2004.

Publishing companies of Norway
Publishing companies established in 1933
Companies based in Oslo
Labour Party (Norway)
Norwegian Confederation of Trade Unions
1933 establishments in Norway